The Constitutional Court of Slovenia (in Slovene: Ustavno sodišče Republike Slovenije, US RS) is a special court established by the Slovenian Constitution. Since its inception, the Court has been located in the city of Ljubljana.

Jurisdiction
Most powers of the Constitutional Court are explicitly determined by the Constitution. In accordance with the Constitution, the Constitutional Court decides in particular on the conformity of laws (and other statutory instruments) with the Constitution (and with laws, respectively), on constitutional complaints of violation of human rights and fundamental freedoms by individual acts, on jurisdictional disputes between various state actors, on the unconstitutionality of the acts and activities of political parties, on appeals against a decision of the National Assembly regarding the confirmation of the election of deputies, on the accountability of the President of the Republic, the Prime Minister, and ministers, as well as on the conformity of a treaty with the Constitution in the process of ratifying the treaty.

Under the Constitution, other matters may also be vested in the Constitutional Court by law. In accordance with this provision the Constitutional Court decides, inter alia, on appeals against a National Assembly decision on the election of Slovenian members to the European Parliament, on the admissibility of a National Assembly decision not to call a referendum on the confirmation of constitutional amendments, or on a request of the National Assembly to review the constitutionality of possible consequences of the suspension of the implementation of a law or due to a law not being adopted in a referendum.

Procedures 

The Constitutional Court has several strictly defined procedures in which cases may be brought before it.

Landmark decisions 
Tito street decision, U-I-109/10 of 3 October 2011.

Judges of the Court

Timeline

Presidents of the Court

Secretaries-General of the Court

See also
Constitution
Constitutionalism
Constitutional economics
Jurisprudence
Judiciary
Rule of law
Rule According to Higher Law

References

External links 
 Constitutional Court of Slovenia (official web page)

Judiciary of Slovenia
Slovenia
Law of Slovenia
Courts in Slovenia